Libertia pulchella, the pretty grass-flag, is a plant in the iris family (Iridaceae).  It is native to Papua New Guinea, New Zealand and Australia, where it occurs in  New South Wales and Victoria and Tasmania. The flowering scape rises above the linear leaves producing 3 to 6 cream-coloured flowers.

References

pulchella
Asparagales of Australia
Flora of Papua New Guinea
Flora of New Zealand
Flora of New South Wales
Flora of Tasmania
Flora of Victoria (Australia)